is a city located in Tochigi Prefecture, Japan. ,  the city had an estimated population of 167,647 in 70,928 households, and a population density of 980 persons per km². In 2006, Oyama became the second most populous city in Tochigi Prefecture, with the capital Utsunomiya retaining the number one spot.

Geography
Oyama is located in the far southeastern corner Tochigi Prefecture, bordered by Ibaraki Prefecture to the south and east. The terrain is almost flat, and the city is in the north-central part of the Kanto plain. The Omoigawa, a branch of the Watarase River flows through the center of the city. The Ubagawa River is on the western end of the city, Tagawa is on the eastern end of the city, and Kinugawa River is on the eastern end. Oyama is approximately 60 kilometers north of the Tokyo metropolis and approximately 30 kilometers south of the prefecture capital of Utsunomiya.

Surrounding municipalities
Tochigi Prefecture
 Tochigi
 Shimotsuke
 Mooka
 Nogi
Ibaraki Prefecture
 Yūki
 Chikusei
 Koga

Climate
Oyama has a Humid subtropical climate (Köppen Cfa) characterized by warm summers and cold winters with heavy snowfall.

Demographics
Per Japanese census data, the population of Oyama has grown steadily over the past 100 years.

History
Oyama-shuku was a post station on the Nikkō Kaidō connecting Edo with the shrines at Nikkō, and was controlled by Utsunomiya Domain during the Edo period. Oyama town was established within Shimotsuga District, Tochigi with the establishment of the modern municipalities system on April 1, 1889. Oyama merged with the neighboring village of Otani on March 31, 1954 and was elevated to city status. On April 18, 1963, Oyama annexed the town of Mamada and village of Mita, both from Shimotsuga District. This was followed by the town of Kuwakinu on September 30, 1965.

Government
Oyama has a mayor-council form of government with a directly elected mayor and a unicameral city legislature of 40 members. Oyama, together with the town of Nogi collectively contributes five members to the Tochigi Prefectural Assembly. In terms of national politics, the town is part of Tochigi 4th district of the lower house of the Diet of Japan.

Economy
Oyama is a regional commercial center with a mixed economy. In agriculture, cultivation of rice, kanpyō and sericulture are important. One of the major employers in the city is Komatsu making iron castings, diesel engines, fork lift trucks and other hydraulic equipment.

Education
Hakuoh University

Primary and secondary schools
Oyama has 25 public primary schools and ten public middle schools operated by the city government. The city has four public high schools operated by the Tochigi Prefectural Board of Education. There is also one private school. The prefectural also operates one special education school for the handicapped. The city also has a North Korean school, Tochigi Korean Elementary and Junior High School (栃木朝鮮初中級学校).

Transportation

Railway
 JR East – Tōhoku Shinkansen
 
 JR East –Tōhoku Main Line (Utsunomiya Line)
  - 
 JR East – Ryōmō Line
  - 
 JR East – Mito Line

Highway

Local attractions
Otomefudōhara Tile Kiln ruins, National Historic Site
Deranohigashi ruins, National Historic Site
Washi Castle, Gion Castle and Nakakuki Castle ruins, collectively a National Historic Site
Biwazuka Kofun, National Historic Site
Marishitenzuka Kofun, National Historic Site

External relations
  - Mission City, British Columbia, Canada, sister-city since October 7, 1996 
  - Cairns, Australia, sister-city since March 15, 2006 
  - Lübz, Germany, since January 2, 2003 
  – Shaoxing, Zhejiang, China, friendship-city since October 22, 2010 
  – Benxi, Liaoning, China, friendship-city since October 26, 2014

Noted people from Oyama
Yasushi Iihara, professional baseball player 
Masashi Ebinuma, Olympic judoka
Hiromichi Kataura, scientist
Hiroaki Takaya, professional baseball player
Kosuke Hagino, Olympic gold medallist swimmer

References

External links

Official Website 

Cities in Tochigi Prefecture
Oyama, Tochigi